Humban-Numena (or Kumban-Numena) was a king of Elam from the Igihalkid dynasty (Middle Elamite Period, mid-14th century BCE). He was a son and successor of King Attar-kittah, as it is attested in his inscriptions from temples in Liyan and in Susa. He is mentioned as the father of King Untash-Napirisha in a later inscription of King Shilhak-Inshushinak. According to a Neo-Babylonian copy of a letter from an Elamite king to the Babylonian court (the so-called the Berlin letter), he married a daughter of the Kassite king Kurigalzu or a daughter of his uncle, the Elamite king Pahir-ishshan.

See also
Humbaba
Khumban

References

Elamite kings
Igihalkid Dynasty